La viuda negra (The Black Widow) is a 2014 Spanish-language telenovela produced by RTI Producciones and Televisa for United States-based television network Univisión and for Colombia-based television network Caracol Television. It is an adaptation of the book La patrona de Pablo Escobar of José Guarnizo based on history from Griselda Blanco.

Series overview

Season 1 (2014) 
The story of Griselda Blanco, a woman who as a teenager was raped by her stepfather. Griselda decides to leave home because her mother did not believe her stepfather abused her. Griselda joins a gang of criminals in order to survive alone in the world. Griselda falls for "Cejas" the first man who betrays her and thus was born "La viuda negra", a woman who murdered her three husbands for having betrayed her.  Her ruthlessness and ability to sell large amounts of cocaine earned her the reputation of The Queen of Cocaine.

Season 2 (2016) 
Griselda has a second chance to live, but to save her son, who is sentenced to die in the electric chair, Griselda agrees to work with the American government and help end a dangerous drug cártel, whose leader is José Joaquín Guerra, alias "El Diablo".

Griselda feels lost and desolate in love, until she meets her guardian angel, Ángel Escudero. This time, the widow will have to choose between returning to wear the crown as "Queen of Cocaine" or secure the future of her new family.

Cast

Main 
 Ana Serradilla as Griselda Blanco
 Julián Román as Richi 
 Ramiro Meneses as Sugar
 Juan Pablo Gamboa as Norm Jones
 Eileen Moreno as Young Griselda
 Lucho Velasco as Robayo
 Margarita Reyes as Celia
 Alex Gil as Killer
 Francisco Bolívar as Agente García
 Jenni Osorio as Juliana
 Emilia Ceballos as Katty
 Isabel Cristina Estrada as Abogada
 Katherine Porto as Susana
 Raúl Méndez as Joaquí Guerra "El Diablo"
 Luis Giraldo as Dylan
 Héctor de Malba as Alejandro Buendía 
 Luis Roberto Guzmán as Ángel Escudero
 Daniel Lugo as Carlos Sarmiento
 César Mora as Pelón
 Antonio Jiménez as Tyler
 Martín Karpan as Brian Ferguson
 María Fernanda Yepes as Venus
 Héctor García as Yépez
 Alejandro López as Rincón
 Luis Carlos Fuquen as "Lokiño"
 Claudio Cataño as Robert Jones
 Mauricio Bastidas as Capó
 Eduardo Victoria as Topo
 Piero Melotti as El Zarco
 Alfredo Anhert as Vicente
 Angeline Moncayo as Daga
 Sandra Beltrán as Cecilia

Recurring 
 Fernando Gaviria as General Guzmán
 Tiaré Scanda as Ana Blanco
 Viviana Serna as Karla Otálvaro
 Julián Farietta as Michael Corleone Blanco
 Yessy García as Silvio
 Camilo Wilson as Cejas
 Rodolfo Silva as Coronel Ronderos
 Ana Soler as Señora Restrepo
 María José Vargas as Child Griselda
 Norma Nivia as La Alemana
 Pablo Valentín as Ceferino
 Carlos Felipe Sánchez as Young Richi
 Luis Eduardo Motoa as Presidente de Colombia
 Ilja Rosendahl as State Attorney
 Vanessa Acosta Paula Gómez
 Camila Kisara as Cinthya
 Claudio Cataño as Robert Jones
 Luis Fernando Montoya as Enzo Vittoria
 Mauricio Mejía as Pablo Escobar
 Lucas Velázquez as Eduardo Farfán
 Roberto Manrique as Doménico Vittoria

Broadcast 
The series premiered on February 23, 2014, in United States on UniMás, on September 1, 2014, in Colombia on Caracol Televisión.

References

2014 telenovelas
2016 telenovelas
RTI Producciones telenovelas
Televisa telenovelas
Colombian telenovelas
American telenovelas
Mexican telenovelas
Spanish-language American telenovelas
2014 Colombian television series debuts
2014 American television series debuts
Caracol Televisión telenovelas
2014 Mexican television series debuts
2016 American television series endings
2016 Colombian television series endings
2016 Mexican television series endings
Television shows set in Bogotá
Television shows set in Medellín
Television shows set in Mexico City
Television shows set in New York City
Television shows set in Miami
Cultural depictions of Griselda Blanco